The 2016 Cup of Nations was the fourth Cup of Nations rugby union tournament since its creation in 2011. The tournament returned to Hong Kong, reprising its name as the Hong Kong Cup of Nations. The tournament acted as a year ending tournament for "up and coming" tier 3 teams from different continents, providing greater preparation for teams to play in their regional competitions, especially with the 2016 participants aiming to qualify for the 2019 Rugby World Cup or to make the Rugby World Cup global repechage in November 2018.

The four competing teams were hosts Hong Kong, reigning champions Russia, Zimbabwe and Papua New Guinea, who were new to the tournament.  Russia successfully defended their title, winning the competition with 14 points.

Format
The tournament was played as a single round-robin, with the winner being the team with the most table points after the third round of fixtures.

The points for the tournament were awarded for:
 Win =  4 points
 Draw = 2 points
 Loss = 1 point
 Scoring 4 or more tries in one game = 1 bonus point
 Losing by 7 or less points = 1 bonus point

Standings

Fixtures

Round 1

Round 2

Round 3

See also
 2016 end-of-year rugby union internationals

References

2016
2016 rugby union tournaments for national teams
International rugby union competitions hosted by Hong Kong
rugby union
2016 in Asian rugby union
2016 in Russian rugby union
rugby union
rugby union
November 2016 sports events in Asia